A superbloom is a rare desert botanical phenomenon in California in which an unusually high proportion of wildflowers whose seeds have lain dormant in desert soil germinate and blossom at roughly the same time. The phenomenon is associated with an unusually wet rainy season. The term may have developed as a label in the 1990s.

Necessary conditions and sequence of events
The conditions under which a superbloom can occur are exceptional. Because some invasive grasses, such as bromes, will compete with native flowers for moisture, the desert must remain dry enough prior to the bloom to keep them from becoming established. The desert must receive rainfall in the autumn, and this rain must penetrate deep into the soil matrix in order to reach a majority of the dormant seeds of flowering plants. If subsequent rainfall is excessive or inundating, the young plants may be carried away in flash floods; if it is inadequate, the seeds will die from dehydration. 

Next, the ground in which the seeds lie must warm slowly over the several months which follow the first soaking rain, and the desert must have enough cloud cover both to shield the soil from intense daytime desert heat and to insulate it from overnight freezing temperatures. Finally, once the newly germinated plants have reached the surface of the soil, the desert must remain undisturbed by strong winds which would uproot the plants or damage the young shoots. The rare concatenation of these events is what makes a superbloom such an extraordinary occurrence.

In California, superblooms typically occur once every ten years or so. This has happened less often since the beginning of the 21st century due to persistent state drought. Anza-Borrego Park and Carrizo Plain National Monument are some of the most popular places to witness a superbloom, and the bloom of 2019 was particularly abundant. This followed another only two years prior, in 2017.

 In the Mojave Desert of California, common plant species which compose the superblooms are brittlebush (Encelia farinosa) (yellow flowers), California poppies (Eschscholzia californica) (bright orange), bluebells (Phacelia campanularia) (deep purple), lupine (purple), sand verbena (Abronia) (yellow), desert sunflowers (Geraea canescens) (bright yellow), evening primrose (Camissonia brevipes) (mostly white, occasionally yellow), popcorn flowers (Plagiobothrys) (white or yellow), and desert lily (Hesperocallis) (white). Several of these plants are also invasive, such as wild mustard.

At Carrizo Plain in California, different annual plant species compose color patches of the hills (Temblor Range and Caliente Range) and the valley floor (Soda Lake).  Dominant color patches of hills are bright yellow (Monolopia lanceolata, Caulanthus inflatus), purple (Phacelia tanacetifolia), magenta/dark pink (Castilleja exserta), and orange (Eschscholzia californica, Mentzelia pectinata). Dominant color patches of the valley floor are golden yellow (Monolopia stricta, Leptosyne calliopsidea), pale yellow (Layia munzii), purple (Phacelia ciliata), and light pink (Caulanthus anceps).

Tourism effects 
Superblooms increase public awareness of California's rural Federal public lands and the state's rich floristic diversity.  It can also have a positive, although brief, effect on the local rural economy. Too much public visitation in such a short time period; however, can have negative impacts.  In 2019, massive traffic jams prompted Lake Elsinore, California to shut down access to Walker Canyon, a major access route for viewing the superbloom.  Dense concentrations of visitors walking off-trail can cause damage or uproot the plants.

Algal superblooms
Because algae often reproduce in large sporadic bouts, referred to as algal blooms, the term "superbloom" is sometimes applied to especially prolific short-term algal growth that causes discoloration of water on a large scale. Other than sharing a botanical context, however, the two events have nothing in common.

References

Flowers
Phenomena
Natural history of California
Desert flora
Algal blooms